Gary Lane may refer to:

 Gary Lane (chess player) (born 1964),  professional chess player and author
 Gary Lane (gridiron football) (born 1942),  American football quarterback and American football official
 Gary Lane (politician) (born 1942), Canadian politician and Saskatchewan MLA

Lane, Gary